The 1916 United States presidential election in Texas took place on November 7, 1916. All contemporary forty-eight states were part of the 1916 United States presidential election. State voters chose 20 electors to the Electoral College, who voted for president and vice president.

Texas was overwhelmingly won by incumbent president Woodrow Wilson. Wilson defeated Charles Evans Hughes by a landslide margin of 59.47%. With 76.92% of the popular vote, Texas would prove to be Wilson's fifth strongest in terms of popular vote percentage after South Carolina, Mississippi, Louisiana and Georgia.

Results

Results by county

See also
 United States presidential elections in Texas

Notes

References

1916 Texas elections
Texas
1916